Iain Mackay is a field hockey player.

Iain Mackay or McKay may also refer to:

Iain Mackay (dancer), of the Birmingham Royal Ballet
Iain Mackay (photographer) from Jorge Aliaga Cacho
Iain MacKay (politician) of Yukon Liberal Party

See also
Iain Mackay-Dick, major-general
Ian Mackay (disambiguation)